MESCORP, originally an acronym for Multimedia University Engineering Society Overseas Research Programme, is an undergraduate-based research work which involves a field study initiated by Multimedia University's engineering students. MESCORP addresses the dire need of qualified IT-knowledgeable engineers in Malaysia by supplementing soft skills such as initiative, creative, innovative qualities to the technical skills acquired through practical applications of theories in laboratory experiments.

History 
Multimedia University Engineering Society Overseas Research Programme (MESCORP) was founded in 2002 by the former dean of the Faculty of Engineering (FOE), Ir. Professor Dato' Dr Chuah Hean Teik, under the patronage of the Chancellor YABhg. Tun Dr. Siti Hasmah Hj. Mohamad Ali(Chancellor 2002-2012).

Awards received:

Achievements 
Ever since 2002, MESCORP has researched and published journals regarding the topics concerned and organized annual conferences to disseminate their findings to the public. MESCORP's track record is as follows:

References 

 Energising Trip
 Focus on Energy
 Conference on ICT
 MMU Students Study Japanese Broadband Success Story

External links 
 Official MESCORP Website
 Multimedia University Engineering Society Official Portal
 Multimedia University
 Cyberjaya Community Portal

Multimedia University
Research projects
2002 establishments in Malaysia